Trismelasmos is a genus of moths in the family Cossidae.

Species
 Trismelasmos agni Yakovlev, 2011 
 Trismelasmos albicans (Roepke, 1955)
 Trismelasmos ardzhuna Yakovlev, 2011 
 Trismelasmos arfakensis Yakovlev, 2011 
 Trismelasmos brechlini Yakovlev, 2011 
 Trismelasmos chakra Yakovlev, 2011 
 Trismelasmos cinerosa (Roepke, 1955)
 Trismelasmos dejongi Schoorl, 2001 
 Trismelasmos drago Yakovlev, 2011 
 Trismelasmos draupadi Yakovlev, 2011 
 Trismelasmos elegans (Roepke, 1955)
 Trismelasmos euphanes (West, 1932)
 Trismelasmos floresi Yakovlev, 2011
 Trismelasmos indra Yakovlev, 2011 
 Trismelasmos jordani (Roepke, 1955)
 Trismelasmos kalisi Yakovlev, 2011
 Trismelasmos kunti Yakovlev, 2011 
 Trismelasmos maculatus (Snellen, 1879) (=Xyleutes pygmaea Roepke, 1957)
 Trismelasmos magellani Yakovlev, 2006
 Trismelasmos major (Roepke, 1957)
 Trismelasmos mindanao Yakovlev, 2011 
 Trismelasmos minimus (Houlbert, 1916)
 Trismelasmos mixta (Pagenstecher, 1888)
 Trismelasmos nakula Yakovlev, 2011 
 Trismelasmos pandu Yakovlev, 2011 
 Trismelasmos papuana (Roepke, 1955)
 Trismelasmos papuasi Yakovlev, 2011 
 Trismelasmos peleng Yakovlev, 2011 
 Trismelasmos sinyaevi Yakovlev, 2011 
 Trismelasmos shudra Yakovlev, 2011 
 Trismelasmos snowensis Yakovlev, 2011 
 Trismelasmos soma Yakovlev, 2011 
 Trismelasmos suriya Yakovlev, 2011 
 Trismelasmos tectorius (Swinhoe, 1901)
 Trismelasmos valentini Yakovlev, 2011
 Trismelasmos varuna Yakovlev, 2011 
 Trismelasmos vulkani Yakovlev, 2011

Former species
 Trismelasmos dictyograpta (Roepke, 1957)
 Trismelasmos robinson Yakovlev, 2004

Etymology
The genus name is derived from Greek tris (meaning thrice) and melasmos (meaning a blackening).

References

 , 2004: New taxa of Cossidae from SE Asia. Atalanta 35(3-4): 369-382.
 , 2006, New Cossidae (Lepidoptera) from Asia, Africa and Macronesia, Tinea 19 (3): 188-213.
 , 2011: Two new species of the goat moths (Lepidoptera, Cossidae) from New Guinea. Amurian zoological journal III(3): 284-286. Full article: .

External links
Natural History Museum Lepidoptera generic names catalog

Zeuzerinae